Stefan Masztak (7 April 1927 – 4 October 2006) was a Polish sports shooter. He competed in the 300 metre rifle, three positions event at the 1960 Summer Olympics.

References

External links
 

1927 births
2006 deaths
Polish male sport shooters
Olympic shooters of Poland
Shooters at the 1960 Summer Olympics
Sportspeople from Vilnius
People from Wilno Voivodeship (1926–1939)